Arthur Griffiths (30 November 1881 – 9 April 1946) was a British cyclist. He competed in two events at the 1912 Summer Olympics.

References

External links
 

1881 births
1946 deaths
British male cyclists
Olympic cyclists of Great Britain
Cyclists at the 1912 Summer Olympics
Sportspeople from Swansea